Eupathithrips is a genus of thrips in the family Phlaeothripidae.

Species
 Eupathithrips affinis
 Eupathithrips atripes
 Eupathithrips dentipes
 Eupathithrips meizon
 Eupathithrips panscopus
 Eupathithrips silvestrii

References

Phlaeothripidae
Thrips
Thrips genera